Manik Saha ministry is the cabinet ministry of Tripura led by the Chief Minister Manik Saha.

On 14 May 2022, just a year before assembly polls in the state, Biplab Kumar Deb resigned from his post. After a hurriedly called BJP legislature party meeting, Deb announced Saha's name as his successor and said he would extend cooperation to the new Chief Minister.

This is a list of ministers from Manik Saha cabinets.

Council of Ministers 

 As in May 2022

See also 
 Government of Tripura
 Tripura Legislative Assembly

References

Bharatiya Janata Party state ministries
Indigenous People's Front of Tripura
2022 in Indian politics
Government of Tripura
Lists of current Indian state and territorial ministries
Tripura ministries
2022 establishments in India
Cabinets established in 2022
Saha